Mithakhali Union is a Union parishad of Mongla Upazila, Bagerhat District in Khulna Division of Bangladesh. It has an area of 89.20 km2 (34.44 sq mi) and a population of 12,187.

References

Unions of Mongla Upazila
Unions of Bagerhat District
Unions of Khulna Division